46th and 8th is the sole album led by trumpeter Waymon Reed recorded in 1977 and released on the Artists House label in 1979.

Reception

AllMusic reviewer Scott Yanow stated: "This was his only opportunity to lead a record date and the results are pleasingly straightahead. ... Nothing surprising occurs but Reed (particularly on a warm version of the ballad "But Beautiful") is in fine form".

Track listing
 "Don't Get Around Much Anymore" (Duke Ellington, Bob Russell) − 8:54
 "Au Privave" (Charlie Parker) − 9:03
 "46th and 8th" (Waymon Reed) − 5:39
 "But Beautiful" (Jimmy Van Heusen, Johnny Burke) − 8:27
 "Blue Monk" (Thelonious Monk) − 6:59

Personnel
Waymon Reed − trumpet, flugelhorn
Jimmy Forrest − tenor saxophone
Tommy Flanagan − piano
Keter Betts − bass
Bobby Durham − drums

References 

1979 albums
Waymon Reed albums
Artists House albums